Pillaia is a small genus of spineless eels native to Asia.

Species
There are currently two recognized species in this genus:
 Pillaia indica Yazdani, 1972 (Hillstream spineless eel)
 Pillaia kachinica S. O. Kullander, Britz & F. Fang, 2000

References

Chaudhuriidae